Tomb Sculptures is a compilation album by the German symphonic black metal band Agathodaimon.

Tracks 
 Tristețea Difuză 08:47
 Sfințit Cu Roua Suferinții  04:45
 Carpe Noctem 04:58
 În Umbra Timpului 05:13
 Dies Irae 05:48
 Stindaardul Blasfemiei 05:48
 Near Dark 15:37
 Noaptea Neființei 03:40
 Fin 02:10

External links
Tomb Sculptures at Discogs
Tomb Sculptures at Encyclopaedia Metallum

Agathodaimon (band) albums
1997 greatest hits albums
Nuclear Blast compilation albums